The Wizard of Oz, subtitled  Live Australian Cast Recording is a cast recording of the 2001 Australian production of the stage musical The Wizard of Oz, featuring Nikki Webster. It was nominated for the 2002 ARIA Award for Best Cast or Show Album.

Background

In 2001 an Australian musical theatre staging of The Wizard of Oz, an adaptation of The Wonderful Wizard of Oz toured the country. It was directed by Nancye Hayes with Peter Casey as musical director. It ran from November 2001 until December 2002 and featured Nikki Webster as Dorothy.

The Wizard of Oz was first staged at the Lyric Theatre in Pyrmont, New South Wales before moving to the Regent Theatre in Melbourne, VIC then onto the Lyric Theatre in South Brisbane, Queensland.

Cast
Nikki Webster - Dorothy
Kane Alexander - Scarecrow (NSW)
Derek Metzger - Scarecrow (VIC, QLD)
Philip Gould - Tinman
Doug Parkinson - Cowardly Lion
Bert Newton - Wizard of Oz
Delia Hannah - Glinda (NSW)
Patti Newton - Glinda (VIC, QLD)
Pamela Rabe - Wicked Witch
Tony Geappen - Uncle Henry

Soundtrack
The original cast recording was released in 2001 through BMG Australia.

Track list:
 Overture  
Over the Rainbow
 Cyclone  
 Come Out Come Out  
 It Really Was No Miracle  
 We Thank You Very Sweetly  
Ding Dong! The Witch Is Dead
 As Mayor of the Munchkin City  
 As Coroner I Must Aver  
 Ding Dong! The Witch Is Dead (Reprise)  
 Lullaby League  
 Lollipop Guild  
 We Welcome You to Munchkinland  
 Follow the Yellow Brick Road - You're Off To See The Wizard  
If I Only Had a Brain
 We're Off To See The Wizard (Duo)  
 If I Only Had a Heart  
 We're Off To See The Wizard (Trio)  
 Lions, Tigers And Bears  
 If I Only Had the Nerve  
 We're Off To See The Wizard (Quartet)  
 Out Of The Woods  
 Entr'acte  
 Merry Old Land Of Oz  
If I Were King of the Forest
Jitterbug
 Witchmelt  
 Curtain Calls  
 Over The Rainbow (Reprise)

Webster released "Over the Rainbow" as a single along with another song, "The Best Days". The double A side single peaked at #21 on the ARIA Singles Chart and was certified gold.

References

Cast recordings
Oz (franchise)